The 24th Robert Awards ceremony was held in 2007 in Copenhagen, Denmark. Organized by the Danish Film Academy, the awards honoured the best in Danish and foreign film of 2006.

Honorees

Best Danish Film 
 Drømmen – Niels Arden Oplev

Best Children's Film 
 Supervoksen – Christina Rosendahl

Best Director 
 Niels Arden Oplev – Drømmen

Best Screenplay 
 Niels Arden Oplev & Steen Bille – Drømmen

Best Actor in a Leading Role 
 David Dencik – A Soap

Best Actress in a Leading Role 
 Trine Dyrholm – A Soap

Best Actor in a Supporting Role 
 Bent Mejding – Drømmen

Best Actress in a Supporting Role 
 Stine Fischer Christensen – After the Wedding

Best Cinematography 
 Jørgen Johansson – Prag

Best Production Design 
 Peter De Neergaard –

Best Costume Design 
 Manon Rasmussen – Drømmen

Best Makeup 
 Anne Katrine Sauerberg – A Soap

Best Special Effects 
 Thomas Dyg – The Lost Treasure of the Knights Templar

Best Sound Design 
 Hans Møller – Prag

Best Editing 
 Åsa Mossberg – Prag

Best Score 
  & Mikael Simpson – Rene hjerter

Best Song 
 "Jeg vil have en baby" –

Non-American Film 
 The Lives of Others – Florian Henckel von Donnersmarck

Best American Film 
 Babel – Alejandro González Iñárritu

Best Short Fiction/Animation 
 Partus – Mikkel Munch-Fals

Best Long Fiction/Animation 
 Liv – Heidi Maria Faisst

Best Documentary Short 
 Lyd på liv – Iben Haahr Andersen & Katia Forbert Petersen

Best Documentary Feature 
 Menneskenes land -

See also 

 2007 Bodil Awards

References

External links 
  

2006 film awards
2007 in Denmark
Robert Awards ceremonies
2007 in Copenhagen